The  is a railway line in Japan, owned and operated by the third sector operator AbukumaExpress. The line connects Fukushima Station in Fukushima Prefecture and Tsukinoki Station in Miyagi Prefecture. Both of these stations are also on the Tōhoku Main Line operated by East Japan Railway Company (JR East).

Station list

History
The original plan was to create a bypass route to relieve overcrowding on the Tōhoku Main Line, but work to extend the line was suspended following the quadrupling of tracks on the Tōhoku Main Line.

In September 1981, the line was proposed for possible closure.

Ownership of the line was transferred to the third-sector Abukuma Express operator from 1 July 1986, initially using former JNR KiHa 22 diesel trains.

The entire line was opened and electrified between Tsukino and Fukushima from 1 July 1988.

On 14 February 2021, all services were suspended due to the 2021 Fukushima earthquake.

References

External links
  
Video of the "Masamune Date ni Kuru" anime themed train wrapping in 2016

 
1067 mm gauge railways in Japan
Railway lines opened in 1968
1968 establishments in Japan
Japanese third-sector railway lines
Rail transport in Miyagi Prefecture
Rail transport in Yamagata Prefecture